The political positions of Libertas were the political positions of members or affiliates of Libertas, the umbrella title given to a constellation of organizations associated with Declan Ganley. Candidates and parties underneath its pan-European arm, Libertas.eu contended the 2009 European Parliament elections.

Preamble
Libertas is a political party founded by Declan Ganley that took part in the 2009 European Parliament election in several member states of the European Union. For the purposes of contending those elections, Libertas candidates ran under lists (the lists of candidates presented to voters in a European election) branded with the Libertas identity, as exemplified by the French approach. Each list was made up of some combination of the following:

members of member parties (member parties usually had names in the Libertas X format e.g. "Libertas Sweden")
members of affiliate parties (parties that were not members of Libertas.eu but cooperate with it electorally)
individual members (people who chose to join Libertas.eu as individuals. Candidates that ran under Libertas lists but who had no national party membership were automatically individual members).

Their political positions were as follows:

EUProfiler
The EUProfiler was produced by a consortium of three institutions (Robert Schuman Centre for Advanced Studies, Kieskompas and the University of Zurich) analysing parties taking part in the 2009 elections.  Some of those parties were Libertas. A summary of their analyses is given below.

Hix-Lord diagram

The EUProfiler gave the positions of political parties on the left-right and Eurosceptic spectra. Six of those parties were Libertas parties. They were as follows:

 Libertas Ireland (LI), Libertas's member party in Ireland
 Mouvement pour la France (MPF), a Libertas affiliate in France
 Chasse, Peche, Nature, Traditions (CPNT), a Libertas affiliate in France
 Libertas Poland (LP), Libertas's member party in Poland
 Partido da Terra (MPT), a Libertas affiliate in Portugal
 Ciudadanos-Partido de la Ciudadanía (C), a Libertas affiliate in Spain

Those positions are summarized on the Hix-Lord diagram (a type of political compass) on the right. The Eurosceptic parties are towards the bottom, Europhile parties towards the top, the left-wing parties are towards the left, and right-wing parties towards the right.

Profile
The EUProfiler also collated party statements into their positions on distinct questions. A summary of those collations for the six Libertas parties analysed is as follows:

CPDS
The University of Bern Institute for Political Science (Universität Bern, Institut für Politikwissenschaft) maintains comparative political datasets CPDS I,II and III classifying political parties from the OECD and EU into distinct political families. Two of those parties were Libertas parties. The CPDS characterized those parties as follows:

Human rights monitors
The Anti-Defamation League, United Nations, and Council of Europe monitor parties for use of racist, xenophobic and/or anti-Semitic discourse. Two of those parties were Libertas parties. They are as follows:

Left-right positions
The Oscarsson and Dahlberg paper "Mapping the European Party Space: Does Party System Simplicity produce Democratic Legitimacy?" characterized parties on the left-right spectrum. Three of those parties were Libertas parties. Oscarsson and Dahlberg characterized those parties as follows (data from 2004):

Notes

References

Libertas.eu